Sanjna Suri (born 31 March 1991) is a Malaysian pharmacist, beauty pageant titleholder, singer, model, and actress. She shot to fame after winning Miss Intercontinental Malaysia in 2017. She was then represented Malaysia at Miss Scuba International 2015, Face of Asia 2017 International Model, Miss Intercontinental 2017 as well as Miss Supranational 2018.

Background
Sanjna was born in Ipoh, Perak. She is of North Indian descent. Sanjna speaks English, Malay, Hindi and understand some Chinese like 'xie-xie' and 'ni hao' and some French words like 'oui', 'merci', 'baguette' 'Evian' and 'croissant'.

Education background
Sanjna is a Pharmacy graduate from University of Cyberjaya. Over the course of her studies there, she received the Dean's List award for six times.

Pageantry

Miss Scuba International 2015
Following her involvement in Miss Malaysia Indian Global 2014 competition, Sanjna was handpicked to represent Malaysia at the Miss Scuba International 2015 held in Kota Kinabalu, Sabah, and was placed Top 5 in Talent.

Face of Asia 2017 International Model
In May 2017, Sanjna competed in Face of Malaysia 2017 competition. She finished as the second runner-up and gained the right to represent Malaysia at Face of Asia 2017 International Model competition in Seoul, Korea.

Miss Intercontinental 2017
In August 2017, Sanjna competed in Miss Grand Malaysia pageant and finished as the second runner-up. She then had rights to represent Malaysia at Miss Intercontinental 2017 in Egypt and was placed in the top 18 semifinalists.

Miss Supranational 2018
In July 2018, Sanjna was appointed to represent Malaysia at Miss Supernatural 2018 by license holder, Ratu Malaysia Organisation. The pageant was held in Krynica-Zdrój, Poland in December 2018, where she finished in the top 25 semifinalists.

Acting career

2018-2019
In 2018, Sanjna appeared in the series, Salon that was aired on NTV7 and Viu. Her first Malay movie, Sangkar is set to be released in 2019. She plays alongside Zul Ariffin and Remy Ishak.

Modelling
Sanjna was featured in the magazine, Nona in April 2018 and Royal Raya 2018 campaign by Shanell Harun. She is also a muse for famed Malaysian designers such as Anuar Faizal, Shanell Harun, Ezuwan Ismail, Edna Mode, Jimmy Couture and Ridzuan Bohari.

Filmography

Film

Television

Music videos

Other ventures

Product endorsements
In 2017, Sanjna starred in TV commercial for Vitagen Malaysia. She is one of the ambassadors for Kronenbourg 1664 alongside Venice Min, Josh Kua, Neal Edwin, and Brynn Lovett. She is also the brand ambassador for HABIB Jewels, Malaysia's premier jeweller.

Awards and nominations

References

External links
 
 
 

Living people
1991 births
People from Ipoh
People from Perak
Malaysian film actresses
Malaysian television actresses
Malaysian female models
Malaysian people of Indian descent
Malaysian people of Punjabi descent
Malaysian beauty pageant winners
21st-century Malaysian actresses